Tall Timber is a 1926 Australian silent film about a rich man who flees the city and works in a timber mill. It is considered a lost film.

In 1937, Cinesound Productions, the company that followed Australasian Films under the Greater Union banner, made a movie set in the timber industry called Tall Timbers. It was directed by Ken G. Hall who claimed he had never seen the 1926 Tall Timber.

Synopsis
Jack Maxwell, son of a wealthy stockbroker, is disowned by his father after a raucous party, and goes to work at a mill in the North Coast timber district owned by his friend Dick Desmond.

He falls in love with Betty Manning, the daughter of the widow who cooks for the workers, and clashes with Steve Black, the ganger of the mill who is behind a spate of timber robberies, who also loves Betty.

A sundowner arrives in camp and shoots Steve in revenge for seducing the sundowner's wife years ago. He also reveals Steve has been blackmailing Dick's father for a murder for which he can now be proved innocent.

Jack saves the mill from a robbery and is offered a partnership from Desmond.

Cast
Billie Sim as Betty Manning
Eden Landeryou as Jack Maxwell
George Willoughby as John Maxwell Snr
Claude Holland as Dick Desmond
Big Bill Wilson as Steve Black
Jimmy McMahon as Jimmy Manning
Charles Beetham as Desmond Fox
Dan Gallagher as Dan
Nellie Ferguson as Mrs Manning
Ray Watson as Agnes Esdale
J.P. O'Neill as sundowner
Bill Murray as burglar

Production
In 1925 Universal announced they would make a film Tall Timber based on a novel by Gordon Goodchild, directed by Lynn Reynolds.

In December 1925 Australasian Pictures announced they would make their own Tall Timbers. It was directed by the actor Dunstan Webb, who later also made The Grey Glove for Australasian Films. At one stage he was also mentioned as a possible director of For the Term of His Natural Life (1927), but he wound up just appearing in it as an actor.

Shooting
The film was shot on location on the New South Wales coast in Langley Vale and in studios at Sydney. Filming started on location in December 1925. According to Everyone's " story is a strong one, and introduces the local lumbering industry to the screen for the first time."

There are some reports Raymond Longford worked on the movie as director but this does not seem to be true.

Titles for the film were written by Sydney journalist Jim Donald.

Bille Sim was a New Zealand actor.

Filming was well publicized and proceeded on a relatively lavish scale.

Reception

Critical
Everyone's said the film:
easily ranks amongst the best of local productions to date. Credit goes to Dunstan Webb, who thus notches success for his first ambitious effort... On Saturday, at the Lyceum, Sydney, this picture received the biggest round of applause from a full house we have yet heard given to a locally produced picture. The Story holds interest throughout. It is set amid the everyday working of a little known industry, and is acted quite intelligently by a small and almost unknown band of players. Despite this fact both story and acting are gripping and Australasian Films Ltd. need by no means be ashamed of this, their latest contribution to local endeavour. The exterior scenes are all excellently conceived and the natural comedy introduced by medium of a clever boy, adds welcome relief to the heavier passages of the story. 
The Bulletin said "The photography is good, and the picture will stand against the ruck of American films; but the ill-written captions are a handicap. That is a detail of picture-production to which Australian producers need to give better attention."

Box Office
The same paper later said that "at the box-offices it proved a consistent puller."

English release
The movie was the only film made by Australasian Films from 1925–27 to receive a cinema release in England. It counted as a British film under the local quota and was distributed there by Universal.

It was sold to the UK outright for £300. Everyone's said this was "a low figure; nevertheless the picture had already earned good money in Australia, and its overseas realisation was a piece of unexpected velvet."

References

External links

Tall Timber at National Film and Sound Archive

1926 films
Australian drama films
Australian silent feature films
Australian black-and-white films
1926 drama films
Lost Australian films
1926 lost films
Lost drama films
Films directed by Dunstan Webb
Silent drama films
1920s English-language films